Kabars were Khalyzians, Turkic Khazar people who joined the Magyar confederation in the 9th century.

Kabar may refer to:

 Kabar (news agency), the official news agency of Kyrgyzstan
 Kabar (grape)
 Kabar, Yemen
 Kabar, Iran

See also 
 Khabar (disambiguation)
 Kabard
 Ka-Bar